Chirality is a peer-reviewed scientific journal publishing original contributions of scientific work on the role of chirality in chemistry and biochemistry in respect to biological, chemical, materials, pharmacological, spectroscopic and physical properties.

References

External links

 Chirality on Journal info

Wiley-Liss academic journals
English-language journals
Monthly journals
Chemistry journals
Publications established in 1989
Physiology journals